A palmetum is a collection of palms (Arecaceae) and not a natural population of palms. Most palmeta are botanical gardens specialized in growing, research, conserve and display species of the family Arecaceae.

History 
Palmeta as palm collections started within the tropical botanical gardens of colonial times, in the 18th and 19th centuries, where plants belonging to the palm family were often grouped. This is the case of Botanical Garden of Buitenzorg (Botanical Garden of Java) and Royal Botanic Gardens of Peradeniya in (Sri Lanka). In modern times many botanical institutions started a new palmetum.

Places 
Some of the most important palm collections are located within the Caracas Botanical Garden in Venezuela; Jardín Botánico Francisco Javier Clavijero in Mexico; the Palmetum of Santa Cruz de Tenerife, in the Canary Islands; Montgomery Botanical Center and Fairchild Tropical Botanic Garden, both in Florida; and Lyon Arboretum in Hawaii.

 
Botanical gardens